This is a disambiguation page.

Armorial of presidents may refer to:

Lists
List of personal coats of arms of presidents of the United States
List of personal coats of arms of vice presidents of the United States